Gold Mine Trash is the first compilation album by English alternative rock band Felt, released in 1987. It collects tracks from the band's singles and albums recorded for Cherry Red between 1981 and 1985. The cover photo shows a detail from the Throne Hall of Neuschwanstein Castle in Germany.

Tracks 3 and 5 were unreleased versions recorded as demos for Blanco y Negro Records. The version of "Fortune" here is a re-recording of the song from the band's first album.

Track listing

Personnel
Felt 1980-1985
Maurice Deebank
Nick Gilbert
Lawrence
Gary Ainge
Mick Lloyd
Martin Duffy
with
Elizabeth Fraser – vocals on "Primitive Painters"

References 

Felt (band) albums
Cherry Red Records albums